Brenne has the following meanings:

 An historical region in the south of the Berry (province) of France
 A regional natural park, the Parc naturel régional de la Brenne in the Indre département of France
 Brenne (river), tributary of the Armançon, of the Seine basin
 Brenne (Cisse), tributary of the Cisse, of the Loire basin